Michel Caron (29 April 1929 in Sèvres - 3 September 2001 in  Le Mesnil-Simon, Eure-et-Loir) was a French operatic tenor and stage actor.

He sang in operettas like The White Horse Inn (1960) and opéra-bouffe La Périchole with Jean Le Poulain and Roger Carel, and Barbe Bleue with Jean Le Poulain and Arlette Didier (1968).

Biographie 
From childhood, Michel Caron wanted to become an actor. He entered the René Simon class, then the Conservatoire de Paris where he won three first prizes: opera, comic opera and operetta.

Caron's career began at the Théâtre du Châtelet to perform Guy Florès during a revival of The White Horse Inn (1960/1961).

He was then at the top of the bill for two plays of opéra-bouffe, performed in 1968, La Périchole with Jean Le Poulain and Roger Carel and Barbe Bleue with Jean Le Poulain and Arlette Didier.

Filmography 
 1978: Les Enquêtes du commissaire Maigret, episode: Maigret et le tueur by Marcel Cravenne
 1981: Le Choix des armes, by Alain Corneau
 1982: Le Démon dans l'île by Francis Leroi

Bibliography 
 Mishima n'était pas un héros, the testimony book of his eldest daughter Laurence Caron-Spokojny on the disappearance of Michel Caron, 3 September 2001, Editions Publibook, 2013, .

References

External links 
  Orphée aux enfers broadcast on ORTF 17 December 1958.
 Emission "DIM DAM DOM" broadcast 31 October 1969 on ORTF, introduced by Marie Laforêt. Le Ténor de la Périchole, Michel Caron.
 Arletty, Georges Van Parys and Michel Caron
 La Périchole by Offenbach directed by Maurice Lehmann with Michel Caron, broadcast on ORTF, 24 December 1971.
 Michel Caron's career, lyric artist and actor
 

1929 births
People from Sèvres
20th-century French male opera singers
French operatic tenors
Artists who committed suicide
2001 suicides
Suicides in France